Coffey Anderson (born December 15, 1978) (sometimes using just his mononym Cofféy or Coffey) is an American country singer-songwriter and internet personality, originally from Bangs, Texas. He came to fame through his YouTube videos releasing Christian versions of mainstream music. In 2008 he took part in Nashville Star.

His self-titled album Coffey Anderson released on September 28, 2010 on Coffey Entertainment / Dream Records / Universal entered the Billboard 200 at No. 134. Five of his eleven albums are general albums: Southern Man (2008), Me and You (2008), Coffey Anderson (2010),  Boots & Jeans (2012), This Is Me (2016) and Country Style (2018). The rest are faith-based Christian albums: Inspiration Vol. 1 (2008), three released in the series Worship Unplugged, Volumes 1 and 2 in 2008, and Vol. 3 in 2011, Redemption (2013) and God Is Enough (2015). He also released Kids Songs EP (2015). And Anderson's newest release Country Style (2018). Anderson founded his own indie label Coffey Global LLC and tours extensively.

Early life
Raised in Bangs, Texas, Coffey Anderson is biracial, the son of a white father and a black mother.

Anderson has a bachelor's degree in Ministry from Howard Payne University (HPU). He also played basketball as a second class All American for the HPU Yellow Jackets team in Brownwood, Texas for period 1999–2002. As a basketball player, he had already been chosen All-State, All-West Texas Super Team and All-Area teams for two seasons along with being named District MVP for his junior and senior seasons before joining the Yellow Jackets.

Musical style
Predominantly a country artist, Anderson previously recorded as a gospel singer. His song "I Wanna Be Your Cowboy" features a country rock sound, while Anderson raps on the song "Hillbilly Gangster".

Career
Anderson became known via his YouTube videos where he sings lively renditions of original and cover materials. singing pop, country and Christian songs. He is also known for his interactive stage performances. Some of his more popular YouTube videos include his compositions "Memphis", "Southern Man" "Rock and Roll Sally", "Can I?" and "Better Today". He has also been involved in Direct-to-Fan networks in the music community, launching his "Direct-to-Fan Live Sessions".

On April 30, 2010, Coffey signed a record deal with Los Angeles label Dream Records. His self-titled album Coffey Anderson released on September 28, 2010 is his first charting album on the US Billboard 200 albums chart. The first single from the album is "You Are All I'm After" with an accompanying music video. He has followed it up with two new singles, "Seek Your Face" and "Sunshine".

In popular culture
Coffey was briefly a contestant on season 2 of American Idol in 2003, making it to the Hollywood round.

Coffey  had a small walk on during the series run of Life Goes On.

Coffey’s song “Mr. Red White and Blue” is occasionally used in TikTok videos.

Nashville Star
In 2008, Anderson was one of the 12 finalists on Nashville Star in its sixth and last season, broadcast nationally on NBC with repeats on American and Canadian CMT networks and a companion radio show entitled Nashville Star Radio featuring the week's performances from the television show, as well as exclusive in-studio performances and interviews with the finalists and judges. Coffey Anderson placed 4th overall. In addition to cover renditions, Anderson sang from his own compositions including "Southern Man" from the CD of the same title, and "Rock'n'Roll Sally". He was eliminated in Week 8 (broadcast July 28, 2008) just before the finals. He finished 4th overall out of 12 finalist acts.

Country Ever After
On 6 November 2020, Netflix premiered Anderson's reality TV sitcom Country Ever After, costarring his wife Criscilla Crossland, their three children and his father, Stanley Anderson. The series was planned to be called Country-Ish but was changed to the present one on launch. The series' first season followed Anderson's independent country music career, Criscilla's battle with stage 3 colon cancer and return to professional dancing, and explored how they mix both with family and their shared faith. The series was produced by Touched by an Angel star Roma Downey.

Appearances in other media
In February 2013, Taco Bell used a Spanish version of Lionel Richie's "Hello", sung by Anderson, in the restaurant chain's Cool Ranch Doritos Locos Tacos commercial.

In 2016, Anderson recorded an instructional video titled "Stop the Violence Safety Video for When You Get Pulled Over by the Police".

Personal life
Anderson met hip-hop dancer Criscilla Crossland at a church in 2008 and they got married on February 14, 2009. The couple has three children; a son and two daughters. Anderson has another daughter from a previous marriage.

He is involved in charity, partnering with the Military Warriors Support Foundation based in San Antonio, Texas.

Discography

Albums

EPs

Videography
2010: "You Are All I'm After / Free"
2013: "2 Blessed 2 Be Stressed"
2013: "Mighty to Save"
2013: "15 Minutes"
2014: "Better Today"
2014: "Hillbilly Gangster"
2014: "All the Way to Texas"
2014: "Mr Red White and Blue"
2015: "Magazine Girl"
2016: "Tacos and Margaritas"
2016: "I Wanna Be Your Cowboy"
2017: "Bud Light Blue"
2017: "Can I"
2017: "Stay with Me"
2018: "Ride Out"
2019: "Memory Lane"
2020: "She's Famous"

References

External links
Official website

Living people
American country singer-songwriters
American gospel singers
Nashville Star contestants
Howard Payne University alumni
People from Brown County, Texas
Singer-songwriters from Texas
Musicians from Los Angeles
Singer-songwriters from California
1978 births
American Idol participants